Mitchell James Langerak (born 22 August 1988) is an Australian professional footballer who plays as a goalkeeper for J1 League club Nagoya Grampus.

Club career

Melbourne Victory

Langerak signed his first professional contract in February 2007, with A-League club Melbourne Victory. Soon after he was sent on loan to South Melbourne for the remainder of the 2007 Victorian Premier League season, to gain game time and experience.

Once the loan finished Langerak continued his duties as the Victory's third choice goalkeeper before Eugene Galekovic moved to Adelaide United. He made his debut for Melbourne in the Round 21 clash of the 2007–08 season against rivals Sydney FC and despite letting in two goals, his performance in the 2–2 draw was a confident debut.

With Galekovic making a move to Adelaide United, Langerak became the second choice keeper. With first choice Michael Theoklitos making his move overseas, Victory signed New Zealand international Glen Moss from Wellington Phoenix. Moss started the 2009–10 as Melbourne's first choice keeper before Langerak grasped his opportunity in the first team to become the side's first choice keeper for the remainder of the season.

On 13 April 2010, Melbourne announced that they had rejected a bid for Langerak from German giants, Borussia Dortmund, however talks continued. On 4 May 2010, Langerak revealed to FourFourTwo Magazine, that Borussia Dortmund had made a second, substantially increased, bid for his services on the same day as the interview, but was again rejected by Melbourne Victory.

South Melbourne 
In 2007, Mitch joined South Melbourne on loan for the 2007 VPL Season. Langerak arrived to the club in turmoil with their first-choice keeper injured and languishing near the bottom of the table at risk of relegation. 

Langerak's solid performances helped South achieve a mid-table finish and allow him to gain valuable experience.

Borussia Dortmund

On 12 May 2010, Melbourne Victory accepted a third offer for Langerak from Borussia Dortmund, a four-year-deal. After joining Dortmund, Langerak became the club's second choice goalkeeper during the 2010–11 Bundesliga season and was a regular in matchday squads. Langerak said his goal for the season was to learn as much as possible.

With Roman Weidenfeller injured, Langerak started his first game for Dortmund in their 3–1 win against reigning German champions Bayern Munich, where he showed a solid performance. Langerak made a return to the first team squad for the first time picked before an available Weidenfeller in Dortmunds second round DFB-Pokal game with Dynamo Dresden. During the game many flares were lit in Signal Iduna Park bringing some concern; no action was taken and Langerak showed signs of jubilation with manager Jürgen Klopp after the game as he recorded his first clean sheet in front of over 80,000 in attendance.

On 12 May 2012, two years to the day after sealing his move to Borussia Dortmund, Langerak came on as a 34th-minute substitute in the DFB-Pokal final against Bayern Munich. He came on for the injured Roman Weidenfeller who had suspected rib damage after a challenge with Mario Gómez earlier in the game. Dortmund went on to win the game 5–2 to claim the cup and Langerak's third title in two seasons at the club.

On 27 July 2013, Langerak won the 2013 DFL-Supercup with Dortmund 4–2 against rivals Bayern Munich.

Langerak played the BVB opener of the 2013–2014 Bundesliga against Augsburg where he kept a clean sheet in a 4–0 win. This means that in the 7 league and Bundesliga games in which Langerak has played, Borussia Dortmund have won.

On 18 September 2013, Langerak made his Champions League debut against Napoli after Weidenfeller was sent off. He broke two front teeth in collision with a goalpost in an unsuccessful attempt to stop Lorenzo Insigne scoring.

On 23 August 2014, Langerak conceded the fastest goal (9 seconds), in the history of Bundesliga, on the opening game of the season 2014–15, a home match against Bayer Leverkusen, which ended 0–2 loss for Dortmund.

VfB Stuttgart
For the 2015–16 season, Langerak moved to VfB Stuttgart. Mitchell Langerak made his Bundesliga debut for VfB Stuttgart on 7 May 2016 at home to FSV Mainz 05. The season ended with Stuttgart's relegation to the 2. Bundesliga. After the departure of Przemysław Tytoń, Langerak was handed the starting position and instantly became a fan favourite.

Levante
On 30 August 2017, Langerak joined Levante on a two-year deal.

Nagoya Grampus
On 14 January 2018, Langerak signed for Nagoya Grampus. On 12 December 2020, he made his 100th appearance in the J.League in a 0–0 away draw against Yokohama FC. On 19 December 2020, he set new J.League record, keeping 17 clean sheets in the 2020 J.League campaign in 1–0 win against Sanfrecce Hiroshima. On 12 September 2021, Langerak broke his own clean sheets record in J.League, keeping 18 clean sheets in a 3-0 victory over Tokushima Vortis. He also set the new all-time record at 823 consecutive minutes without conceding a goal in the 2021 J.League campaign.

International career
Langerak was selected in the Young Socceroos squad to play in the 2006 AFC Youth Championship. Langerak received his first senior national team call-up in March 2011, named by coach Holger Osieck as a member of the 17-man squad to play Germany in a friendly match. 

Langerak made his debut for Australia's senior team in an international friendly against France on 12 October 2013, a match in which the Socceroos were thrashed 6–0. This match turned out to be manager Holger Osieck's final match in charge of Australia, with his sacking coming shortly after the conclusion of the match. Langerak made his second appearance for Australia against Canada, a match which Australia won 3–0.. Langerak was included in the 23 man squad going to Brazil for the 2014 FIFA World Cup. He was also included in Australia's final list for 2015 AFC Asian Cup, which was held in Australia, but he didn't play a single match.

In May 2021, having represented Australia eight times, Langerak announced his retirement from international football due to wanting to remain with his family during the COVID-19 pandemic. In September 2022, Langerak came out of international retirement ahead of the 2022 FIFA World Cup, following relaxation of restrictions on international travel, but was not selected for the World Cup squad.

Honours

Club

Melbourne Victory
 A-League Pre-Season Challenge Cup: 2008
 A-League Championship: 2008–09
 A-League Premiership: 2008–09

Borussia Dortmund
 Bundesliga: 2010–11, 2011–12
 DFB-Pokal: 2011–12
 DFL-Supercup: 2013, 2014
 UEFA Champions League runner-up: 2012–13

VfB Stuttgart
 2. Bundesliga: 2016–17

Nagoya Grampus
 J.League Cup: 2021

International
Australia U20
AFF U-19 Youth Championship: 2006

Australia 
 AFC Asian Cup: 2015

Individual
 PFA Harry Kewell Medal: 2009–10
 J.League MVP of the month: December 2020, September 2021
 J.League Best XI: 2021

Records
 J.League 1 most clean sheets in a season: 21 (2021)

 Longest consecutive run without conceding a goal in J.League 1 : 823 minutes

Career statistics

Club

International

References

External links

 

1988 births
Living people
Australian people of Dutch descent
Australian soccer players
Australia international soccer players
Australia under-20 international soccer players
Association football goalkeepers
Australian expatriate soccer players
Australian expatriate sportspeople in Germany
Australian expatriate sportspeople in Spain
VfB Stuttgart players
Levante UD footballers
Borussia Dortmund players
Borussia Dortmund II players
South Melbourne FC players
Nagoya Grampus players
A-League Men players
Bundesliga players
2. Bundesliga players
3. Liga players
J1 League players
Australian Institute of Sport soccer players
2014 FIFA World Cup players
2015 AFC Asian Cup players
2017 FIFA Confederations Cup players
Expatriate footballers in Germany
Expatriate footballers in Spain
Expatriate footballers in Japan
Sportspeople from Bundaberg
AFC Asian Cup-winning players
2019 AFC Asian Cup players